Kate  Næss (née Doughty) (born 13 August 1983)  is an Australian paraequestrian and paratriathlete. She won a bronze medal at the 2015 World Triathlon Grand Final. She represented Australia at the 2016 Rio Paralympics when paratriathlon made its debut at the Paralympics.

Personal

Doughty was born on 13 August 1983. She was born without her right hand. Doughty has completed a master's degree in Organisational & Industrial Psychology at Deakin University. She is employed as a psychologist and management consultant in Melbourne. She is patron of the Aussie Hands Foundation Inc. Her father Anthony is a bookmaker in Melbourne.  She married Norwegian Jarle Naess in early 2018 and they have a son  Henrik.

Career

Equestrian
Began riding horses at the age of six. Her parents were involved in the horse industry. Her equestrian achievements include:
2005 Victorian Championships - 2nd
2005 Riding Disabled Australia Nationals - 1st section 4B ; 3rd section 4a
2006 British Nationals - 1st & 3rd
2008 Selection Trials for Beijing Paralympics
2009 Carlton performance Horses Championship -  Medium Champion
2009 Victorian Dressage Club Championships Elem Freestyle - 1st
2010 Australian Team at the World Equestrian Games in Kentucky, USA

Triathlon
Doughty competes in the PT4 classification. in 2015, she first competed in paratriathlon competitions. 2015 results include:
2nd - OTU Paratriathlon Oceania Championships - Penrith
2nd ITU World Paratriathlon Event - Sunshine Coast 
1st - 2015 Australian Paratriathlon Championships 
1st ITU World Paratriathlon Event - Yokohoma
3rd - ITU World Paratriathlon Event - Detroit
3rd -  ITU World Triathlon Grand Final - Chicago

Doughty had the goal of competing at the 2016 Rio Paralympics and placed fifth in the Women's PT4 event. In reflection on her event she states "My aim is go out and do the best I can and to walk away knowing that I did everything I could do to execute my best on race day." Doughty also recalls "I've been wanting to come to the Paralympics and compete and I thought I'd be doing it on a horse. So doing it on my own legs was a shock."

At the 2019 ITU World Triathlon Grand Final in Lausanne, she finished sixth in the Women's PTS5.

She announced her retirement from elite triathlon in August 2020.

Recognition
2004 - Equestrian Federation of Australia Young Rider of the Year finalist 
2007 "Leader" Sports Star of the Year – Eastern Region 
2015 - Victorian Institute of Sport scholarship holder

References

External links

International Triathlon Union Profile
Doughty - Patron of Aussie Hands - YouTube
Victorian Institute of Sport Athlete Profile
2016 Rio Paralympics Games - Results

1983 births
Living people
Paratriathletes of Australia
Paratriathletes at the 2016 Summer Paralympics
Australian female triathletes
Sportspeople from Melbourne
Australian psychologists
Australian women psychologists
Deakin University alumni